Cioabă is a surname. Notable people with the surname include:

Aristică Cioabă (born 1971), Romanian footballer and manager
Florin Cioabă (1954–2013), Romanian Romani Pentecostal minister

Romanian-language surnames